Jarred Craig Rothwell is a South African Muay Thai boxer. He is a five time South African Muay Thai champion in four weight divisions, a bronze medalist at the 2011 IFMA World Championships and a silver medalist at the 2011 Arafura Games. He won the World Muaythai Council (WMC) MAD World Title Belt in 2012, and the South African Muaythai Association Middle Weight Professional Champion in 2013.  Jarred qualified for the 2013 World Combat Games, competing in the 71kg division.

Titles
 SAMA Middleweight Professional Champion 2013
 South African Light Middleweight Champion 2012
 World Muaythai Council MAD Title 2012 (WMC) 
 Arafura Games Silver 2011 
 IFMA World Championships Bronze 2011
 South African Middle Weight Champion 2011
 South African Light Heavyweight Champion 2010.

References

Living people
South African Muay Thai practitioners
Sportspeople from Cape Town
South African male kickboxers
Year of birth missing (living people)